Virginia Gay (born 16 September 1981) is an Australian actress, writer and director, mostly known for her work on the Australian TV dramas Winners & Losers (as Frances James), and All Saints (as Gabrielle Jaeger).

Education
Born in Sydney, Gay attended Summer Hill Public School and Newtown High School of the Performing Arts in Sydney as a drama and music student. She studied English literature and performance studies at Sydney University and was a member of the Sydney University Dramatic Society from 2001 to 2003. She left Sydney University and enrolled at the Western Australian Academy of Performing Arts (WAAPA), at the Edith Cowan University, Perth, where she graduated in 2005 with an Advanced Diploma of Performing Arts. She won the Coles Myer Institute Vocational Student of the Year award and the prestigious Sangora Education Foundation Award for Vocational Education and Training.

Career
While still at WAAPA, Gay unsuccessfully auditioned for the role of Ricky on All Saints. However, she impressed the directors so much that after graduation in 2006, she was called in to audition for the role of Gabrielle Jaeger. She appeared in the final four seasons of the show, between 2006 and 2009.

In 2008, she appeared with Ian Moss (of Cold Chisel fame) as her professional partner on the reality series It Takes Two and the pair came third. Gay and Moss made It Takes Two history, scoring a 10 from judge Ross Wilson in their first performance on the show.

In October 2008, Gay was part of the cast in a concert performance of the musical Breast Wishes in support of Breast Cancer.

In February/March 2009, when Shane Jenek (Courtney Act) injured his leg in a skiing accident, Gay was asked to replace Jenek in the production Gentlemen Prefer Blokes for the Mardi Gras festival.

From March 2011, Gay portrayed Frances James in the TV series Winners & Losers on the Seven Network.

From 2011 to 2016, Gay made several appearances as a guest panelist on the ABC's First Tuesday Book Club hosted by Jennifer Byrne. 

During August 2012, Gay performed her cabaret show Dirty Pretty Songs at the Edinburgh Fringe Festival in The Famous Spiegeltent.

In 2016, Gay played the title character in Hayes Theatre Co's production of Calamity Jane. It was directed by Richard Carroll with musical director Nigel Ubrihien, choreographer Cameron Mitchell, and producer Michelle Guthrie. The show ran from August 3 to 7. This was Calamity Janes professional debut in Australia although the play has a long production history via Australian amateur troupes. Virginia Gay reprised the title role in a full production of Calamity Jane which played at the Hayes Theatre from 8 March - 1 April 2017  and later the Belvoir Theatre, Sydney. It then toured to many venues in south-eastern Australia, including Melbourne and Canberra in 2018.

In 2022 Virginia Gay wrote and performed in the play, Cyrano for the Melbourne Theatre Company. The play is a gender – flipped, modern re-imagining of Cyrano de Bergerac written in 1897 by Edmond Rostand.

Personal life 
In June 2008, Gay was the victim of a violent assault by two men in the suburb of Marrickville in Sydney. The men then went on to murder chef Daniel Owen.

Charity work 
In May 2009, Gay was the national ambassador for Cystic Fibrosis Australia's annual awareness and fundraising campaign 65 Roses Day. Gay also attends the Good Friday Appeal held in Melbourne every year to support the Royal Children's Hospital.

Filmography

Film

Television

Theatre

Awards and nominations

References

External links

Virginia Gay, Yahoo!7
 (by Mondo Rock) on Good News Week, November 2009

Actresses from Sydney
Australian television actresses
Australian stage actresses
Living people
1981 births
People educated at Newtown High School of the Performing Arts